Hans van der Noordaa (born 26 February 1961, Enschede, Netherlands) is a Dutch manager, and former CEO of the banking and insurance ING Group Asia, Africa and Australia and the Postbank N.V.

Life 
Hans van der Noordaa has been Chairman and CEO of Retail Division, ING Netherlands and ING Group N.V. since 16 December 2003. In 1985, Van der Noordaa started at NMB Bank upon his graduation from the Technical University Twente, where he studied management science and economics. He was appointed as a junior management consultant at the Rotterdam regional office and at the Amsterdam-based head office. Between 1987 and 1991, he was CFO at ABN AMRO Bank  for Organisation and Information at the Retail Division. In 1991, he returned to NMB Bank, which merged with Postbank and is now part of NMB Postbank Group. At NMB Bank, he was first appointed as head of Organisation & Control and later as deputy regional manager for the Netherlands. At the end of 1994, he assumed responsibility for corporate funds transfer at ING Bank, ING Group and Postbank. In 1998, Hans van der Noordaa was appointed as general manager International Cash Management, in which position he was responsible for European funds transfer. In 2000, he was CEO of the Corporate Communications & Strategy of ING Group and CEO of the Postbank N.V. In 2012, he participated in a Global CEO Program at IESE Business School, University of Navarra.

In 2014 he left the ING Group to join Delta Lloyd Group as CEO. In 2018 he joined Deloitte Financial Services as a senior advisor.

References

External links 
 Hans van der Noordaa profile at ING Group 

1961 births
Living people
Dutch businesspeople
ING Group
People from Enschede